Noelvis Entenza González (born 13 July 1985) is a Cuban professional baseball pitcher for Industriales de La Habana in the Cuban National Series.

Entenza played for the Cuba national baseball team at the 2009 World Port Tournament and 2017 World Baseball Classic.

References

External links

1985 births
Living people
Cuban baseball players
Baseball pitchers
Industriales de La Habana players
Elefantes de Cienfuegos players
Sabuesos de Holquin players
2017 World Baseball Classic players